Lake Township is one of twelve townships in Humboldt County, Iowa, USA. As of the 2000 census, its population was 290.

History
Lake Township was organized in 1870.

Geography

Cities, towns, villages
Hardy

Adjacent townships
 Vernon Township (north)
 Boone Township, Wright County (northeast)
 Liberty Township, Wright County (east)
 Eagle Grove Township, Wright County (southeast)
 Norway Township (south)
 Beaver Township (southwest)
 Grove Township (west)
 Humboldt Township (northwest)

Cemeteries
The township contains Hardy Trinity Lutheran Cemetery and Lake Church Cemetery.

Political districts
 Iowa's 4th congressional district
 State House District 4

References
 United States Census Bureau 2008 TIGER/Line Shapefiles
 United States Board on Geographic Names (GNIS)
 United States National Atlas

External links
 US-Counties.com
 City-Data.com

Townships in Humboldt County, Iowa
Populated places established in 1870
Townships in Iowa
1870 establishments in Iowa